AB2 may refer to:

Aircraft 
 Aichi AB-2, a prototype Japanese reconnaissance floatplane of the 1930s
 Bernard AB 2, a planned French biplane aircraft of the 1910s
 Curtiss Model AB-2, an American flying boat designation of the 1910s

Other uses 
 Alberta Highway 2, a road in Canada
 AB2, an obsolete designation within the Scottish AB postcode area
 AB2, an axiom about Abelian categories, in mathematics
 AB2, a variant of the Class AB amplifier (see also )
 AB2, a rating within the seaman rank of the United Kingdom Navy